Vesele is an urban-type settlement in Melitopol Raion (district) of Zaporizhzhia Oblast in southern Ukraine, but was formerly under Vesele Raion. It serves as the administrative center of Vesele Raion. Population: . In 2001, its population was 11,096 according to the census.

The first mention of the settlement dates back to 1815.

Gallery

References

External links
 veselivska-gromada.gov.ua – Official site of Vesele

Urban-type settlements in Melitopol Raion
Populated places established in 1815
1815 establishments in the Russian Empire